Espace Communautaire Lons Agglomération is the communauté d'agglomération, an intercommunal structure, centred on the town of Lons-le-Saunier. It is located in the Jura department, in the Bourgogne-Franche-Comté region, eastern France. Created in 2017, its seat is in Lons-le-Saunier. Its area is 196.7 km2. Its population was 34,189 in 2019, of which 17,189 in Lons-le-Saunier proper.

Composition
The communauté d'agglomération consists of the following 32 communes:

Baume-les-Messieurs
Bornay
Briod
Cesancey
Chille
Chilly-le-Vignoble
Condamine
Conliège
Courbouzon
Courlans
Courlaoux
L'Étoile
Frébuans
Geruge
Gevingey
Lons-le-Saunier
Macornay
Messia-sur-Sorne
Moiron
Montaigu
Montmorot
Pannessières
Perrigny
Le Pin
Publy
Revigny
Saint-Didier
Trenal
Verges
Vernantois
Vevy
Villeneuve-sous-Pymont

References

Lons
Lons